Cornubia is a suburb in the City of Logan, Queensland, Australia.

Geography
Many street names reflect its lush bush setting (e.g. Sugarwood, Parkview). The Beenleigh–Redland Bay Road runs through the south of the locality from west to east.

History 
Cornubia was named as a bounded locality by Queensland Place Names Board on 1 May 1975.  Cornubia is the Latin name for Cornwall.

St Matthew's Catholic Primary School opened on 23 January 1984 with 57 students in Years 1 through 3 with the support of the Sisters of St Joseph of the Sacred Heart in the tradition of Mary McKillop.

Chisholm Catholic College opened in 1992.

, the population of Cornubia was around 3,300. 10 years prior there were only 2,000 people in the area. The suburb has a young population (median age of 35). About 6% of people are unemployed.  After English (90%), the most spoken languages are Dutch and German.

The median age of the Cornubia population was 37 years, the same as the national median.  70.2% of people living in Cornubia were born in Australia. The other top responses for country of birth were England 7%, New Zealand 6.4%, Scotland 1.7%, South Africa 1.5%, Germany 0.7%.  88.9% of people spoke only English at home; the next most common languages were 0.7% Mandarin, 0.6% Afrikaans, 0.5% German, 0.4% Dutch, 0.4% Greek.

Education 
St Matthew's School is a Catholic primary (Prep-6) school for boys and girls at 172-180 Bryants Road. In 2017, the school had an enrolment of 552 students with 37 teachers (32 full-time equivalent) and 28 non-teaching staff (17 full-time equivalent).

Chisholm Catholic College is a Catholic secondary (7-12) school for boys and girls at 204 California Creek Road. In 2017, the school had an enrolment of 937 students with 72 teachers (69 full-time equivalent) and 45 non-teaching staff (34 full-time equivalent).

Fauna 
Cornubia is part of the Koala Coast and is home to hundreds of Australian native animals including koalas, wallabies, goannas and various species of birds (e.g. rainbow lorikeet).

Cornubia Forest Nature Refuge
 A protected nature conservation area was created by the local government council from land purchased between 1999 and 2010. Located in the north-west of the suburb, the  nature refuge consists of the former Cornubia Forest Park to the south and land known as the Cornubia Escarpment in the north. It is managed as part of Australia’s National Reserve System with objectives that include both conservation of flora and fauna, and recreation such as bushwalking and mountain bike riding. The refuge is also managed under a Koala Nature Refuge Agreement with the state government. The tall open forest ecosystem of blackbutt (Eucalyptus pilularis) and the brown thornbill (Acanthiza pusilla) in the area are described as endangered.

Transport
Over 70% of employed people travel by car as most residents work in Brisbane City or at the Gold Coast. Efficient and cost-effective public transport is available in the area and is provided by the Logan City Bus Service, a privately owned company.

References

External links
 
 

Suburbs of Logan City